Govindgarh may be
Govindgarh, Uttar Pradesh,a village in Gautam Buddh Nagar District, Uttar Pradesh
Govindgarh, Madhya Pradesh, a city in Rewa District, Madhya Pradesh
Govindgarh, Rajasthan, a city in Alwar District, Rajasthan